William Wallace Fenn (February 12, 1862 in Boston - March 6, 1932 in Cambridge) was a Unitarian minister and a dean of Harvard Divinity School. He served the First Unitarian Church of Chicago from 1890–1901.

He gave the 1921 The Ingersoll Lectures on Human Immortality.

Education
Fenn graduated from Harvard in 1884 and received an AM and STB (bachelor of sacred theology) from the Divinity School in 1887.

References

External links
 The papers of William Wallace Fenn are in the Harvard Divinity School Library at Harvard Divinity School in Cambridge, Massachusetts.

American Unitarians
Harvard Divinity School alumni
Harvard University staff

1862 births
1932 deaths
People from Boston